The Global Stocktake is a fundamental component of the Paris Agreement which is used to monitor its implementation and evaluate the collective progress made in achieving the agreed goals. The Global Stocktake thus links implementation of nationally determined contributions (NDCs) with the overarching goals of the Paris Agreement, and has the ultimate aim of raising climate ambition.

Background 
The Paris Agreement marked a turning point in international climate policy. Binding under international law and global in scope, it not only sets out ambitious global goals, such as limiting the rise in average global temperature to well below 2°C compared with pre-industrial levels, but also introduces an innovative architecture that gives Parties considerable leeway in setting their own climate change targets. In contrast to common practice under international environmental law, states' individual contributions are not negotiated at international level and achievement of set targets is not binding. To ensure that the targets are implemented nonetheless, international-level review and transparency mechanisms have been made integral to the Agreement.

Role as part of the Paris regime 
The Paris Agreement requires its signatory states (known as Parties) to regularly formulate their own climate action plans, so-called nationally determined contributions (NDCs), and to implement measures that help them achieve their climate action goals. There is, however, no obligation under international law for Parties to achieve their NDCs.

Parties are, however, required to regularly report on their progress in implementing their NDCs and the reports are subject to international peer review. In addition to this Enhanced Transparency Framework, the Paris Agreement stipulates that Parties must regularly update their NDCs, that the updated NDCs must not fall short of the targets applicable prior to the update and that they should reflect the highest possible level of ambition.  In addition, a Global Stocktake is carried out once every five years to assess the collective progress made towards achieving the long-term goals. The outcomes of the stocktake are to be taken into account when developing nationally determined contributions.  The Global Stocktake is thus a fundamental component of the Paris Agreement in that it regularly takes stock of progress made and provides a basis for use in updating Parties' NDCs.

Role in raising ambition 
The Global Stocktake is designed to raise ambition by helping Parties to: 

 See what they have achieved so far in implementing their NDCs.
 Identify what still needs to be done to achieve their NDC targets.
 Identify the approaches that can be taken to enhance their own efforts at national and international level.

In this way, it is hoped that the Global Stocktake will become a driver of ambition. However, the Global Stocktake takes a collective rather than an individual approach. This means that individual countries are not singled out and the outcomes of the stocktaking process should not allow conclusions to be drawn about the state of implementation in individual states.

Scope 
The question of whether the Global Stocktake should be limited to mitigation or should also include other aspects such as adaptation and the provision of climate finance has been the subject of controversial debate. In the run-up to the Climate Change Conference in Paris, however, the view prevailed that the Global Stocktake should take in all three. As part of the Global Stocktake, Article 14 of the Paris Agreement lists adaptation and the means of implementation and support.

Three-phase Global Stocktake 
The modalities for implementation agreed at the Climate Change Conference in Katowice provide for three stocktake phases:

Phase 1: Information collection and preparation 
Phase 1 involves collecting and preparing information needed to conduct the stocktake. Information is taken from various sources. In addition to Parties' nationally determined contributions (NDCs) and the associated reports submitted under the Paris Agreement, the most recent scientific findings of the Intergovernmental Panel on Climate Change (IPCC) as well as inputs from non-governmental stakeholders and observer organisations are also used. The information gathered is published in the public domain and also collated in the form of synthesis reports. Individual reports are also prepared on various focus topics – mitigation, adaptation and (financial) support – and on issues such as the status of global greenhouse gas emissions, the overall contribution made by NDCs and the status concerning action taken to adapt to climate change.

Phase 2: Technical assessment of information 
In Phase 2, the information is assessed for collective progress in implementing the Paris Agreement and its long-term goals. This sees various stakeholders entering into a series of technical dialogues to discuss the information gathered in Phase 1. Phase 2 is also used to highlight the opportunities to strengthen and enhance response measures in dealing with climate change. The results are documented in a series of reports.

Phase 3: Political messages derived from the technical assessment 
In Phase 3, the outcomes of the assessment flow into the policy process. The aim here is to support Parties to the Paris Agreement in enhancing both their climate change policies and the action they take to support other Parties. The outcomes are also used to promote international cooperation. On this point, it is unclear as to how the outcomes are to be documented – perhaps a political declaration or even a formal decision by the Conference of the Parties.

Outlook 
The first Global Stocktake will take place in 2023. However, the transparency framework established by the Paris Agreement, which requires each individual state to report on the status of implementation of its NDC targets, and its national emissions, will not come into effect until 2024. Since Parties' reports compiled under the transparency framework are a vital source of information in conducting the Global Stocktake, the first Global Stocktake will have to build on earlier reporting requirements. These have numerous informational gaps, however, and it is uncertain as to what extent those gaps can be filled using other sources of information. For example, it is conceivable that greater use could be made of analyses and recommendations from non-governmental stakeholders, including civil society initiatives, companies and city administrations. Another aspect that still needs to be worked out concerns the exact timing of the three Global Stocktake phases. In particular, it must be ensured that the outputs of the process are completed in time and prepared in such a way that they can be taken into account appropriately when developing Parties' NDCs.

See also 
 Pledge and review

References 

Environmental terminology
Climate change

Environmental social science
Political economy
21st-century treaties